Pandeli Toumazis Ralli JP DL (22 May 1845 – 22 August 1928) was a Greek-British politician.

Ralli was born in Marseille, the son of Toumazis "Thomas" Stephanou Ralli of Ralli Brothers and his wife, Marie, daughter of Pandeli Argenti.  The family established itself in Belgrave Square. Pandeli was educated in Middlesex and at King's College London. He graduated from Trinity College, Cambridge in 1866 with a Bachelor of Arts degree.

He was elected Liberal Member of Parliament for Bridport in 1875 and held the seat until 1880. He was elected Liberal Member of Parliament for Wallingford in 1880 and held the seat until the constituency was abolished in 1885.  He held the offices of Justice of the Peace for Surrey, and Deputy Lieutenant of Dorset. 
He later stood unsuccessfully as a Liberal Unionist.

After a long illness, he died unmarried, aged 83, in Brighton, Sussex. His sister Ioanna married Sir Richard Reynolds-Moreton and was the mother of the Viscountess Byng of Vimy.

Elections

References

External links 
 
 Online British Home Office record of Pandeli Ralli's naturalization

1845 births
1928 deaths
Alumni of King's College London
Alumni of Trinity College, Cambridge
Liberal Party (UK) MPs for English constituencies
UK MPs 1874–1880
UK MPs 1880–1885
Deputy Lieutenants of Dorset
Liberal Unionist Party parliamentary candidates
British people of Greek descent